Dannah Gresh (born 1967) is an author, speaker, and the founder of True Girl, a Christian tween event for mothers and daughters ages 8–12. She is also the founder of Pure Freedom, a ministry which focuses on sexual theology, purity, and holiness for teens. Books written by Gresh include And the Bride Wore White: Seven Secrets to Sexual Purity and Lies Young Women Believe: And the Truth that Sets Them Free which she co-authored with Nancy Leigh DeMoss. She lives in State College, Pennsylvania with her husband, Bob. In 2021, She was named the Cedarville University "2021 Alumna of the Year."

Beliefs about human sexuality 
Gresh promotes abstinence before marriage with an emphasis for young women. Additional views on human sexuality include:

 Abstinence is the only form of HPV prevention which is 100% effective 
 You get addicted and bonded to the people you have sex with
When a virgin woman's hymen breaks during intercourse, it forms a blood covenant between the woman, her husband, and God

Published works 

And the Bride Wore White, 2000, 2012 (revised and re-released)
 Secret Keeper, 2002, 2011 (revised and re-released)
 Pursuing the Pearl, 2003
 Secret Keeper Girl: Eight Great Dates (About Modesty & Beauty), 2004
 Secret Keeper Devos, 2005, 2011 (revised and re-released)
 The Secret of the Lord,, 2006
 Five Little Questions That Reveal the Life God Designed For You, 2007
 Lies Young Women Believe (with Nancy Leigh DeMoss), 2008
 Secret Keeper Girl: Eight Great Dates (About Friendship), 2008, 2013 (revised and re-released)
 My Best Friend, Jesus, 2008
 Danika’s Totally Terrible Toss, 2008
 “T” is for AnTONIa, 2008
 Just Call Me Kate, 2008
 Yuzi’s False Alarm, 2008
 Six Ways To Keep The “Little” In Your Girl, 2010
 The One Year Mother-Daughter Devo, 2010
 What Are You Waiting For, 2011
 Six Ways to Keep the “Good” In Your Boy, 2012
 One Year Teen Devo, 2013
 Get Lost: Your Guide to Finding True Love, 2013
 A Girl’s Guide to Best Friends and Mean Girls, 2013
 Pulling Back the Shades (with Dr. Juli Slattery), 2014
 Secret Keeper Girl Pajama Party, 2014
 A Girl’s Guide to Understanding Boys, 2014
 8 Great Dates for Dads and Daughters: Talking With Your Daughter About Understanding Boys (with Bob Gresh), 2014
 Raising Body Confident Daughters: 8 Conversations to have with your tween, 2015
 It’s Great to Be a Girl! A Guide to Your Changing Body (with Suzy Weibel), 2015
 It’s Great to Be a Guy! God Has a Plan for You and Your Body (with Jarrod Sechler), 2016
Dannah Gresh Version (Bible Translation), 2016
The 20 Hardest Questions Every Mom Faces: Praying Your Way to Realistic, Biblical Answers, 2016
Secret Keeper Girl, 2017
Madres críen hijas satisfechas imagen (Spanish Edition), 2017
Lies Women Believe: And the Truth that Sets Them Free (with Nancy DeMoss Wolgemuth), 2018
Lies Young Women Believe: And the Truth that Sets Them Free (with Nancy DeMoss Wolgemuth), 2018
Lies Young Women Believe Study Guide: And the Truth that Sets Them Free (with Nancy DeMoss Wolgemuth and Erin Davis), 2018
Lies Girls Believe: And the Truth that Sets Them Free (with Nancy DeMoss Wolgemuth), 2019
A Mom's Guide to Lies Girls Believe: And the Truth that Sets Them Free (Lies We Believe) (with Nancy DeMoss Wolgemuth), 2019
True Girl Mom-Daughter Devos: with Coloring Experience, 2019
True Girl: Discover the Secrets of True Beauty, 2019
Mentiras que las niñas creen, Guía para mamás: Y La Verdad Que Las Hace Libres (Spanish Edition), 2020
Mentiras que las niñas creen: Y la Verdad Que las Hace Libres (Spanish Edition), 2020
Por qué es mejor esperar: Lo Que Nadie Te Dice Acerca del Sexo (Spanish Edition), 2020
Habakkuk: Remembering God's Faithfulness When He Seems Silent, 2020
Ruth: Becoming a Girl of Loyalty (True Girl Bible Study), 2021
8 Great Dates for Dads and Daughters: How to Talk About the Differences Between Boys and Girls (with Bob Gresh), 2021
8 Great Dates for Moms and Daughters: How to Talk About Cool Fashion, True Beauty, and Dignity, 2021
Raising a Body-Confident Daughter: 8 Godly Truths to Share with Your Girl, 2021
Talking with Your Daughter About Best Friends and Mean Girls: Discovering God's Plan for Making Good Friendship Choices (8 Great Dates), 2021
Miriam: Becoming a Girl of Courage (True Girl Bible Study), 2021

References

External links
 

1967 births
Living people
People from State College, Pennsylvania
21st-century American non-fiction writers
American family and parenting writers
American relationships and sexuality writers
American Christian writers
Writers from Pennsylvania
21st-century American women writers
21st-century theologians
Protestant writers
Members of the Christian and Missionary Alliance
Abstinence-only sex educators
Businesspeople from Pennsylvania
American women in business
American women educators
Women Christian religious leaders
Women and sexuality
Educators from Pennsylvania
Women religious writers
American women non-fiction writers